Harrison was a Major League Baseball left fielder who played in one game for the Washington Senators on September 27, .

Harrison, whose first name is unknown, went hitless in two at bats, with one base on balls. His appearance did not impress either when fielding or batting, and a local newspaper's account of the game concluded of him that "If Manager Manning intended Harrison's appearance yesterday as a farewell joke, it is all right, and we will accept an apology, but if he was really serious and believed the fellow possessed the requisite qualities of a ball tosser, the local big chief is either deluding himself or else he is the victim of a gold brick enterprise."

References

External links

Year of birth missing
Year of death missing
Washington Senators (1901–1960) players
Major League Baseball left fielders